John Milton Bryan Simpson (May 30, 1903 – August 22, 1987) was a United States circuit judge of the United States Court of Appeals for the Fifth Circuit and the United States Court of Appeals for the Eleventh Circuit and previously was a United States district judge of the United States District Court for the Southern District of Florida and the United States District Court for the Middle District of Florida.

Education and career

Born in Kissimmee, Florida, Simpson received a Bachelor of Laws from the Fredric G. Levin College of Law at the University of Florida in 1926. He was in private practice of law in Jacksonville, Florida from 1926 to 1946. He was an assistant state's attorney of the Fourth Florida Circuit from 1933 to 1939. He was a Judge of the Criminal Court of Record in Duval County, Florida from 1939 to 1943. He was a United States Army First Lieutenant from 1943 to 1945. He was a Judge of the Criminal Court of Record in Duval County from 1945 to 1946. He was a Circuit Judge of the Fourth Judicial Circuit Court of Florida from 1946 to 1950.

Federal judicial service

Simpson was nominated by President Harry S Truman on September 14, 1950, to a seat on the United States District Court for the Southern District of Florida vacated by Judge Louie Willard Strum. He was confirmed by the United States Senate on September 23, 1950, and received his commission on September 26, 1950. He served as Chief Judge from 1961 to 1962. He was reassigned by operation of law on October 29, 1962 to the newly created United States District Court for the Middle District of Florida, to a seat established by 76 Stat. 247. He served as Chief Judge from 1962 to 1966. His service was terminated on November 22, 1966, due to elevation to the Fifth Circuit.

Simpson was nominated by President Lyndon B. Johnson on October 11, 1966, to the United States Court of Appeals for the Fifth Circuit, to a new seat created by 80 Stat. 75. He was confirmed by the Senate on October 20, 1966, and received his commission on November 3, 1966. He assumed senior status on June 30, 1975. He was reassigned by operation of law on October 1, 1981, to the United States Court of Appeals for the Eleventh Circuit. His service was terminated on August 22, 1987, due to his death.

Notable case

Simpson was noted for his legal decisions during the civil rights demonstrations in St. Augustine, Florida that led directly to the passage of the landmark Civil Rights Act of 1964.

Honor

The John Milton Bryan Simpson United States Courthouse in Jacksonville in named in his honor.

References

Sources

External links
A Guide to the Judge John Milton Bryan Simpson Papers, 1933-1983 - University of Florida George A. Smathers Libraries Special and Area Studies Collections

1903 births
1987 deaths
20th-century American judges
20th-century American lawyers
Fredric G. Levin College of Law alumni
Judges of the United States Court of Appeals for the Fifth Circuit
Judges of the United States Court of Appeals for the Eleventh Circuit
Judges of the United States District Court for the Southern District of Florida
Judges of the United States District Court for the Middle District of Florida
People from Kissimmee, Florida
United States Army officers
United States court of appeals judges appointed by Lyndon B. Johnson
United States district court judges appointed by Harry S. Truman